The United States Court of Federal Claims (in case citations, Fed. Cl. or C.F.C.) is a United States federal court that hears monetary claims against the U.S. government. It was established by statute in 1982 as the United States Claims Court, and took its current name in 1992. The court is the successor to trial division of the United States Court of Claims, which was established in 1855.

The courthouse of the Court of Federal Claims is situated in the Howard T. Markey National Courts Building (on Madison Place across from the White House) in Washington, D.C.

History

Court of Claims (1855–1982) 

The court traces its origins directly back to 1855, when Congress established the United States Court of Claims to provide for the determination of private claims against the United States government. The legislation was signed into law on February 24, 1855, by President Franklin Pierce. Throughout its 160-year history, although it has undergone notable changes in name, size, scope of jurisdiction, and procedures, its purpose has remained the same: in this court the federal government stands as the defendant and may be sued by citizens seeking monetary redress. For this reason, the court has been referred to as the "keeper of the nation's conscience" and "the People's Court."

As originally in 1855, the court lacked the essential judicial power to render final judgments. This oversight was resolved by legislation passed in 1866, in response to President Abraham Lincoln's insistence in his Annual Message to Congress in 1861 that, "It is as much the duty of Government to render prompt justice against itself, in favor of citizens, as it is to administer the same, between private individuals."

In 1887, Congress passed the Tucker Act, which significantly expanded the court's jurisdiction to include all claims against the government except tort, equitable, and admiralty claims. The court thus today has nationwide jurisdiction over most suits for monetary claims against the government and sits, without a jury, to determine issues of law and fact. The general jurisdiction of the court, described in 28 U.S.C. § 1491, is over claims for just compensation for the taking of private property, refund of federal taxes, military and civilian pay and allowances, and damages for breaches of contracts with the government. The court also possesses jurisdiction over claims for patent and copyright infringement against the United States, as well as over certain suits by Indian tribes.

Additionally, the court has jurisdiction to hear both pre-award and post-award bid protest suits by unsuccessful bidders on government contracts.

A unique aspect of the court's jurisdiction throughout its history has been the authority to act on congressional references of legislative proposals for compensation of individual claims. As eventually codified in 28 U.S.C. § 1492, either House of Congress may refer a bill to the Chief Judge of the court for an investigation and a report to Congress. A judge of the court is assigned to act as the hearing officer and preside over the judicial proceedings. Then a three-judge review panel submits a report to Congress for its consideration and disposition of such claims for compensation.

Befitting its unique role, the court has been located throughout its history in Washington, D.C., in the vicinity of the White House or in the U.S. Capitol Building. It first met in May 1855 at Willard's Hotel. In July of that year, it moved into the Capitol. After briefly using the Supreme Court's chamber in the basement of the Capitol, it then acquired its own rooms there. In 1879, the court obtained space on the ground floor of the Freedman's Bank Building, which stood at the place now occupied by the Treasury Annex, adjacent to the southeast corner of Lafayette Park. Two decades later, in 1899, the court moved to the building formerly occupied by William Corcoran's art collection across Lafayette Park at the intersection of 17th Street and Pennsylvania Avenue.

It remained there for 65 years. This building was designed by, and is presently named for, the architect James Renwick, who also designed the Smithsonian Institution's Castle on the National Mall and St. Patrick's Cathedral in New York City. When the facilities there were deemed inadequate by the mid-1950s, the court asked Congress for a new location. Eventually, the site at 717 Madison Place, NW, was chosen and the court moved to its present home on August 1, 1967.

The court's original composition of three judges was expanded to five in 1863. They would consider evidence proffered by claimants and weigh testimony taken by permanent or special commissioners employed by the court, who were dispersed across the United States. One of the first commissioners was Benjamin Harrison of Indiana, who would later become President. If oral argument was requested, the five judges would hear the case en banc. Appeal to the Supreme Court was by right if the amount in dispute was over $3,000. The growth in government caused by and coinciding with World War I made the system unworkable, as the number of filed cases increased considerably. In 1925, legislation enacted by Congress at the request of the court created a separate trial division of seven commissioners and elevated the five judges to an appellate role. Initially, the trial commissioners would function as special masters in chancery and conduct formal proceedings either at the court's home in Washington, D.C., or elsewhere in the United States in a court facility amenable to the parties. The trial procedures evolved to resemble a non-jury civil trial in district court.

In 1948, the commissioners were authorized to make recommendations for conclusions of law. The number of commissioners was increased in 1953 to 15. In 1966, Congress provided that there would be seven appellate judges to be appointed by the President with life tenure. In 1973, the title of the commissioners was changed to trial judge and by 1977, the Court of Claims had 16 trial judges who conducted trials of cases in the first instance. Judgments, which are required to be paid out of appropriations by Congress, were originally paid by individual appropriations passed separately or as part of other appropriations bills. In 1955, Congress provided for a standing appropriation for judgments of $100,000 or less. Finally, in 1977, Congress created a permanent, indefinite appropriation for all judgments awarded by the court.

Current institution (since 1982) 
The Federal Courts Improvement Act of 1982 created the modern court. While the appellate division of the Court of Claims was combined with the United States Court of Customs and Patent Appeals to comprise the new United States Court of Appeals for the Federal Circuit, the trial division of the Court of Claims became the United States Claims Court (and in 1992, the name was changed to the United States Court of Federal Claims). Appeals from the Court of Federal Claims are taken to the United States Court of Appeals for the Federal Circuit and a judgment there is conclusive unless reviewed by the Supreme Court on writ of certiorari. Decisions of the Court of Claims are binding precedent on both its appellate and trial court successors.

The court, as now constituted, consists of 16 judges, appointed by the President and subject to confirmation by the U.S. Senate for terms of 15 years. In addition, judges who have completed their statutory terms of office are authorized to continue to take cases as senior judges of the court. This ongoing tenure serves as a mechanism to ensure judicial impartiality and independence.

In recent years, the court's docket has been increasingly characterized by complex, high-dollar demands, and high-profile cases in such areas as, for example, the savings and loan crisis of the 1980s, the World War II internment of Japanese-Americans, and the federal repository of civilian spent nuclear fuel.

Nevertheless, despite the nature of the claim, the notability of the claimant, or the amount in dispute, the Court of Federal Claims acts as a clearing house when the government must settle with those it has legally wronged. As observed by former Chief Judge Loren A. Smith, the court is the institutional scale that weighs the government's actions against the standard measure of the law and helps make concrete the spirit of the First Amendment's guarantee of the right "to petition the Government for redress of grievances."

The National Childhood Vaccine Injury Act of 1986 gave the court the authority to create an Office of Special Masters to receive and hear certain vaccine injury cases, and the jurisdiction to review those cases. This vaccine injury jurisdiction has been enlarged in recent years to encompass claims stemming from a number of additional vaccines, including, for example, varicella, hepatitis B, and influenza.

Though a provision of the Administrative Dispute Resolution Act of 1996 gave the Court of Federal Claims and U.S. districts courts concurrent jurisdiction over post-award protests, subsequent legislation provided that, as of January 2001, that the United States Court of Federal Claims would be the exclusive judicial forum for post-award bid protest litigation.

In 2006, the court rendered judgments in more than 900 cases and awarded $1.8 billion in damages.

Jurisdiction 

The court has special jurisdiction, spelled out in : it hears claims for monetary damages that arise from the United States Constitution, federal statutes, executive regulations, or an express or implied in fact contract with the United States Government, most notably under the Tucker Act. The court is established pursuant to Congress's authority under Article One of the United States Constitution. Claims have a statute of limitations of six years from the time the claim first accrues. 

The court has concurrent jurisdiction involving contracts with the federal government, where a contractor has the option of choosing between filing suit with the court or with the agency Board of Contract Appeals. The general rule is that a contractor may either 1) file suit within 90 days with the agency Board of Contract Appeals or 2) file suit within one year with the court. A contractor, however, must choose which forum in which to file; a contractor cannot file suit with both the agency Board and with the court. (However, in a case where a contractor has filed with the Board, and the Government challenges the timeliness of the filing — the 90-day limit is statutory and cannot be extended — the contractor can file with the court within the one-year period to protect its claims).

Unlike district courts, which generally only have jurisdiction over disputes in their geographic district, the CFC has jurisdiction over disputes wherever they occur in the country. To accommodate litigants, judges on the court may hold trials at local courthouses near where the disputes arise.

All trials at the court are bench trials, without juries. Because the court only hears cases against the Government, the United States is always the defendant in cases before the CFC.

The court receives a variety of claims against the government, including breach of contract claims, illegal exaction claims, takings claims under the 5th Amendment, claims involving military pay, claims for patent and copyright infringement against the government, federal tax refund claims, and protests regarding contract bidding procedures. According to the Court, tax refund suits make up a quarter of the claims brought before it, although the court exercises concurrent jurisdiction with United States district courts in this area.

Orders and judgments from the court are appealed to the United States Court of Appeals for the Federal Circuit, which resides in the same building as the CFC.

This court does not have jurisdiction in claims arising under the Federal Tort Claims Act, which are heard in the appropriate venue United States district court, 28 USC § 1346(b)(1), nor judicial review of the decisions of the Board of Veterans' Appeals. Certain procedural differences accrue due to the different jurisdiction, e.g., under the FTCA, the statute of limitations runs two years from the date of the tortious occurrence, or six months from the final denial of administrative relief. See:Exhaustion of remedies.

Congressional references 

The court also may hear congressional reference cases, which are cases referred to the court by either house of Congress. The judge serving as hearing officer renders a report as to the case's merits, which is reviewed by a panel of judges formed for that purpose. The report is forwarded back to the chamber of Congress requesting it.

Judges 

Unlike judges of courts established under Article Three of the United States Constitution, judges on the Court of Federal Claims do not have life tenure (see Article I and Article III tribunals). Instead, they serve for 15-year terms and are eligible for reappointment. The President appoints the judges of the U.S. Court of Federal Claims with the Senate's advice and consent. The judges are removable by the U.S. Court of Appeals for the Federal Circuit for "incompetency, misconduct, neglect of duty, engaging in the practice of law, or physical or mental disability."

Current composition of the court 
:

Vacancies and pending nominations

Former judges

Chief judges

Succession of seats

See also 
 Rules and Forms
 Federal Tort Claims Act
 Tucker Act
 United States Court of Appeals for the Federal Circuit
 New York Court of Claims

References

Bibliography 
 The United States Court of Federal Claims handbook and procedures manual by David B. Stinson. 2nd ed. Washington, D.C.: Bar Association of the District of Columbia, 2003.
 The United States Court of Federal Claims : a deskbook for practitioners by United States Court of Federal Claims Bar Association. 4th ed. Washington, D.C.: The Bar Association, 1998.

Further reading 
 The Jurisdiction of the Court of Federal Claims and Forum Shopping in Money Claims Against the Federal Government

External links 
 Website of the United States Court of Federal Claims
 Papers of Franklin M. Stone, former judge, U.S. Court of Claims, Dwight D. Eisenhower Presidential Library

 
Federal claims
Aboriginal title in the United States
Federal sovereign immunity in the United States
Government procurement in the United States
1855 establishments in the United States
Courts and tribunals established in 1855